Jalukie Upper Khel is a village in the Peren district of Nagaland, India. It is located in the Jalukie Circle.

Demographics 

According to the 2011 census of India, Jalukie Upper Khel has 77 households. The effective literacy rate (i.e. the literacy rate of the population, excluding children ages 6 and below) is 25.66%.

References 

Villages in Jalukie Circle